Digitus primus or first digit can refer to:
 Thumb or pollex (digitus primus manus)
 Big toe or hallux (digitus primus pedis)